The 1998 MFS Pro Tennis Championships, also known as the U.S. Pro Tennis Championships, was a men's tennis tournament played on outdoor hard courts at the Longwood Cricket Club in Boston, United States that was part of the World Series of the 1998 ATP Tour. It was the 70th edition of the tournament and was held from August  24 through August 30, 1998. Michael Chang won the singles title.

Finals

Singles

 Michael Chang defeated  Paul Haarhuis, 6–3, 6–4
 It was Chang's 1st singles title of the year and the 32nd of his career.

Doubles

 Jacco Eltingh /  Paul Haarhuis defeated  Chris Haggard /  Jack Waite, 6–3, 6–2

References

External links
 ITF tournament details

U.S. Pro Tennis Championships
1998
MFS Pro Tennis Championships
MFS Pro Tennis Championships
MFS Pro Tennis Championships
Tennis in Massachusetts